Toxocnemis is a genus of beetles in the family Melolonthidae. There is at least one described species in Toxocnemis, T. cochranei.

References

Melolonthinae
Articles created by Qbugbot